Nick Mingione (born September 10, 1978) is a baseball coach and former outfielder, who is the current the head coach of the Kentucky Wildcats. He played college baseball at Embry–Riddle University for coach Greg Guilliams from 1997 to 2000.

Playing career
Mingione played his college career at Embry–Riddle University.  He graduated from ERU in 2000 with a degree in aerospace studies.

Coaching career

Kentucky
After serving as an assistant college  coach for 13 seasons, Mingione was named head coach of Kentucky for the 2017 season.  In his first season as a head coach, he was named SEC Coach of the Year. He also led Kentucky to its first regional win and first super regional appearance in the program's history.

Head coaching record

References

1978 births
Living people
Embry–Riddle Eagles baseball players
Embry–Riddle Eagles baseball coaches
Kentucky Wildcats baseball coaches
Florida Gulf Coast Eagles baseball coaches
Mississippi State Bulldogs baseball coaches
Western Carolina Catamounts baseball coaches